"Cloudy Day" is a song by Australian singer Tones and I. It was released on 10 June 2021 through Bad Batch Records, distributed by Sony Music in Australia and New Zealand and globally by Elektra Records as the third single from her debut studio album, Welcome to the Madhouse.

At the 2022 ARIA Music Awards, the song was nominated for ARIA Award for Song of the Year.

Background
Discussing the song's origins, Tones and I said that after her friend Ben Tournier (aka "T") died in January 2021, she was struggling to complete her album. She was called into then-Sony Music Australia CEO Denis Handlin's office who told her this saying from his late mother — "on a cloudy day, look up into the sky and find the sun". Tones said "I knew I wanted to use that as a lyric and the next time I went into the studio I wrote 'Cloudy Day'.

Critical reception
Greta Brereton from NME opined that the song "is reminiscent of her 2020 "Fly Away", saying it features "soaring chorus crescendos and choir-style vocal accompaniment, big brass and rhythmic clapping add to the gospel feel of the track, which also arrived alongside an animated music video". Leena Tailor from Variety called the song "the perfect pandemic anthem".

Charts

Weekly charts

Year-end charts

Certifications

References

2021 singles
2021 songs
ARIA Award-winning songs
Songs written by Tones and I
Tones and I songs